The Antagonists is a 1971 historical novel by Ernest K. Gann about the siege of the Masada citadel in Israel by the 10th Legion of the Roman Empire in AD 73. The novel was adapted as a television miniseries, Masada, broadcast first in 1981. The two antagonists of the title are Eleazer ben Yair, leader of the Jewish Zealots who make a final stand on Masada; and the Roman general Flavius Silva.

A sequel, entitled The Triumph, was published in 1986.

Overview
The novel explores the themes of leadership and patriotism by comparing and contrasting the two protagonists/antagonists of the story. Little survives from history, so the account is heavily fictionalized.

References

External links
Movie Review: Masada, The Prayer Foundation, 8 May 2008.

1971 American novels
Novels set in the 1st century
Novels set in ancient Israel
American novels adapted into television shows